Assumption reinsurance is a form of reinsurance whereby the reinsurer is substituted for the ceding insurer and becomes directly 
liable for policy claims. This ordinarily requires a notice and release from affected policyholders. In the more typical reinsurance arrangement, the reinsurer has an obligation to indemnify the ceding insurer, which remains liable for claims on policies it has issued, and policyholders' approval is not required.

Types of insurance
Reinsurance